RISCOS Ltd. (also referred to as ROL) was a limited company engaged in computer software and IT consulting. Company founders include developers who formerly worked within Acorn's dealership network. It was established as a nonprofit company. On or before 4 March 2013 3QD Developments acquired RISCOS Ltd's flavour of RISC OS. RISCOS Ltd was dissolved on 14 May 2013.

History 
RISCOS Ltd was formed to continue end-user-focused development of RISC OS after the de-listing of Acorn Computers, following its purchase by Morgan Stanley Dean Witter in order to benefit from the shareholding that Acorn held in ARM Ltd. In March 1999, RISCOS Ltd obtained exclusive rights to develop and sell RISC OS 4 for the desktop market from Element 14. A few weeks later Pace purchased Acorn's Cambridge headquarters and staff for £200,000 and then continued to develop its own, in-house version of RISC OS, primarily for set-top boxes and other embedded devices.

At the time of the company's formation, it was noted that having access to the source code could facilitate removal of the OS's dependence on Acorn's proprietary chips. This simplifies entry to the hardware market by new companies.

On 29 January and 14 May 2013 RISCOS Ltd was listed in the London Gazette: on 14 May 2013 it was struck from the register of companies and dissolved. The rights to all versions of RISC OS previously developed and marketed by RISCOS Ltd were  purchased by 3QD Developments Ltd, the maker of VirtualAcorn.

Products

RISC OS 4 

RISCOS Ltd completed work on RISC OS 4 and in July 1999 it was released as an upgrade for existing machines, priced at £120. Improvements include support for long filenames, larger disk sizes and partitions, along with a new desktop look.

Work then continued on a system of soft-loaded updated versions of the OS, released under an annual subscription release scheme named RISC OS Select in 2002.

In 2004, the company replaced its baseline RISC OS 4.02 product with an updated version of the OS named RISC OS Adjust. This version of RISC OS was based on version 4.39, or Select Edition 3 Issue 4, of the company's Select scheme. In the same year, RISCOS Ltd agreed to produce a fully 32-bit-compatible version of RISC OS Adjust for Advantage Six's A9home product. The A9home was released in May 2006 after a 12-month beta-testing process, although the build of Adjust 32, namely RISC OS 4.42, is not feature-complete.

RISC OS Six 

In October 2006, a beta-version of RISC OS Six was made available for download by subscribers to the Select scheme. RISC OS Six represents the next generation of RISCOS Ltd's stream of the operating system. Significant portability, stability and internal structure improvements, including full 26/32-bit neutrality, have laid the foundations for the company's future releases, all of which will be based on version 6. The first product to be based on RISC OS Six will be Select Edition 4. RISC OS Six is 32-bit-neutral and can be built to run in either 26-bit or 32-bit modes. It runs on the Risc PC and A9home, but it doesn't run on newer-generation hardware such as the Iyonix PC and ARMini, which do not support the 26-bit addressing used on the older Acorn computers and require specific hardware support for the newer ARMv5 and ARMv7 architecture chips that they use.

Licensed emulation 

In 2003, the company reached an agreement with VirtualAcorn to license its OS for use with emulators.

Potential ports 

In 1999, the company announced plans to port the OS to machines such as the Jornada sub-notebook. A number of planned ports did not come to fruition.

Licence dispute 

In November 2002 Castle Technology Ltd released a modified version of Pace's 32-bit RISC OS as RISC OS 5 for their Iyonix PC, in apparent contravention of the licence agreement that RISCOS Ltd held with Element 14. In July 2003, Castle bought all technology rights to RISC OS from Pace in an attempt to legalise the situation. In January 2004, Castle also took over Tematic Ltd., the company formed by ex-Pace engineers when they were made redundant in March 2003. The result was a long-running and acrimonious dispute between RISCOS Ltd and Castle over licensing, which ultimately led to Castle claiming to terminate RISCOS Ltd's licence to develop, sell and sub-license RISC OS 4. RISCOS Ltd refuted all the claims made and challenged Castle to identify how and from whom they had acquired RISC OS 5. An end to the dispute was signalled when RISCOS Ltd and Castle agreed to work on attempting to merge their development streams and re-unify RISC OS, with Castle's engineers working on key system functionality and RISCOS Ltd on user-facing elements. One of the conditions was that RISCOS Ltd agreed to be renamed RISC OS Developments Ltd. ROL and Castle subsequently agreed to merge  and  together, this merge nor the name change did happen before the dissolution of RISCOS Ltd.

RISCOS Ltd considered taking legal action in 2008 to prevent RISC OS Open from releasing a RiscPC compatible ROM image.

References 

RISC OS
Companies based in Cardiff
British companies established in 1999